Rugby Club Locomotive Tbilisi is a Georgian semi-professional rugby union club from Tbilisi, who plays in the Georgia Championship, the first division of Georgian rugby.

Achievements 

Georgia Championship:
Winner (9): 1992, 1994, 2000, 2001, 2003, 2005, 2006, 2008, 2010, 2018
Runner-up (3): 1967, 1990, 1991
Third place (11): 1968, 1972, 1978, 1981, 1995, 1996, 1999, 2002, 2007, 2009, 2011
Georgia Cup:
Winners (7): 1978, 1992, 2000, 2003, 2004, 2005, 2006

Current squad
2019/20

Notable players
   Shalva Mamukashvili
   Guram Gogichashvili
   Beka Kakabadze
   Beka Bitsadze
   Giorgi Begadze
   Giorgi Aptsiauri
   Bidzina Samkharadze
   George Shkinin
   Beka Tsiklauri

See also
 Rugby union in Georgia
 http://site.rugby.ge/ka-GE/Lokomotivi/

Locomotive
Sport in Tbilisi